Mara Ribeiro (born 11 May 1995) is a Portuguese racewalker. In 2019, she competed in the women's 50 kilometres walk at the 2019 World Athletics Championships held in Doha, Qatar. She finished in 15th place.

References

External links 
 

Living people
1995 births
Place of birth missing (living people)
Portuguese female racewalkers
World Athletics Championships athletes for Portugal